Klaus Herm (13 January 1925; Berlin, Germany–24 May 2014) was a German television actor.

He started his career with several stage engagements, for example 18 years at Staatliche Schauspielbühnen Berlin.

Selected filmography
 Derrick - Season 5, Episode 7: "Kaffee mit Beate" (1978, TV)
 Tod eines Schülers (1981, TV miniseries)
 Derrick - Season 8, Episode 6: "Tod eines Italieners" (1981, TV)
 Derrick - Season 9, Episode 4: "Die Fahrt nach Lindau" (1982, TV)
  Derrick - Season 10, Episode 4: "Der Augenzeuge" (1983, TV)
 Derrick - Season 11, Episode 14: "Stellen Sie sich vor, man hat Dr. Prestel erschossen" (1984, TV)
 Schwarz greift ein (1994–1999, TV series)

References

External links

Agency Ute Nicolai 

1925 births
2014 deaths
German male television actors
20th-century German male actors
21st-century German male actors
Male actors from Berlin
Rundfunk im amerikanischen Sektor people